Ferruccio Mazzola (1 February 1945 – 7 May 2013) was an Italian former professional footballer and manager, who played as a midfielder. He was the son of former footballer Valentino Mazzola, and the younger brother of retired footballer Sandro Mazzola.

Club career
Ferruccio grew up in Internazionale youth team (1963–64); at the time, his older brother, Sandro, was playing in the senior side under legendary manager Helenio Herrera, which, due to its success, has come to be known as La Grande Inter. He played for long periods with Venezia (1965–67), following his father's footsteps, and also Lazio (1968–74), where he won an Italian Championship during the 1973–74 season, also captaining the squad for a time. He also briefly played for the Inter senior side (1967), Marzotto (1964–65), Lecco (1967–68), Fiorentina (1971–72), and Sant'Angelo (1974–77), also spending a season on loan with NASL side Hartford Bicentennials in 1975, before retiring from professional football with Sant'Angelo in 1977, at the age of 30. In the summer of 1976 he played in the National Soccer League with Toronto Italia. Despite being a talented young footballer, he had a difficult career, partially due to his strong character, and was unable to achieve the success of his father and older brother.

Managerial career
He retired from active football in 1977 to pursue a coaching career; he obtained two promotions from Serie C2 to C1 (Siena 1984–85 and Venezia 1987–88).

Controversy
In 2004, in a book (Il terzo incomodo) and in an interview with L'espresso Mazzola spoke out against the use of performance-enhancing drugs in sport made by Internazionale, Lazio and Fiorentina during the 1960s and the 1970s.

In 2005 the prosecutor's office of Florence opened an investigation into the death of Fiorentina footballer Bruno Beatrice, hypothesizing that this could have been caused by doping. However, on 2 January 2009 it requested the dismissal of the case by the statute of limitations. Meanwhile, Internazionale chairman Massimo Moratti sued Mazzola for defamation about his statements. The ex-footballer won the legal case in 2010: according to the judgement's motivation, the claims in the book could not be considered libellous.

Several Grande Inter teammates denied those accusations, however, with one exception being Franco Zaglio, who said the use of illicit substances had been common for various Serie A clubs since the 1950s. Some years after Ferruccio's decease, his elder brother Sandro Mazzola declared that Ferruccio's complaint was motivated by a desire for "revenge" against Internazionale and that the true doping of Helenio Herrera was "psychological". Luna Herrera, Helenio's daughter, pointed out that her father was a committed health enthusiast, and that he would only give his players cachets of acetylsalicylic acid, which were taken with coffee as stimulants.

Death
Mazzola died in Rome on 7 May 2013 after a long illness.

Honours

Club
Venezia
Serie B: 1965–66
Lazio
Serie A: 1973–74
Coppa delle Alpi: 1971
Serie B: 1968–69

References

1945 births
2013 deaths
Footballers from Turin
Italian footballers
Italian expatriate footballers
Serie A players
Italian football managers
Inter Milan players
Venezia F.C. players
Calcio Lecco 1912 players
S.S. Lazio players
ACF Fiorentina players
Connecticut Bicentennials players
Toronto Italia players
North American Soccer League (1968–1984) players
Canadian National Soccer League players
Expatriate soccer players in Canada
Italian expatriate sportspeople in Canada
Expatriate soccer players in the United States
Italian expatriate sportspeople in the United States
A.C.N. Siena 1904 managers
S.P.A.L. managers
Venezia F.C. managers
A.C. Perugia Calcio managers
Spezia Calcio managers
U.S. Alessandria Calcio 1912 managers
Association football midfielders
A.C.D. Sant'Angelo 1907 players